Ministry of Love is a 2016 Croatian comedy film directed by Pavo Marinković.

Cast 
 Stjepan Perić - Kreso
 Dražen Kühn - Sikic
 Ecija Ojdanić - Dunja
 Olga Pakalović - Sandra
 Milan Štrljić - Slavko
 Ksenija Marinković - Brigadirka Rukavina
 Alma Prica - Ljerka
 Oleg Tomac - Janko
 Bojan Navojec - Ico

References

External links 

2016 comedy films
2016 films
Croatian comedy films